Bolshiye Lipyagi is a rural locality (a selo) and the administrative center of Bolshelipyagovsky Rural Settlement, Veydelevsky District, Belgorod Oblast, Russia. The population was 608 as of 2010. There are 6 streets.

Geography 
Bolshiye Lipyagi is located 10 km north of Veydelevka (the district's administrative centre) by road. Gapleyevka is the nearest rural locality.

References 

Rural localities in Veydelevsky District